Morgan County is a county located in the north central Piedmont region and the lake country region of the U.S. state of Georgia. As of the 2020 census, the population was 20,097. The county seat is Madison.

Since the early 21st century, the county has had a housing boom. It has proximity to Lake Oconee, a recreation site, as well as to major employment centers such as Atlanta, Athens, Augusta and Macon.

History
Morgan County was created on December 10, 1807. It was named for renowned Revolutionary War commander Daniel Morgan. During the American Civil War, the county provided the Panola Guards, which was a part of Cobb's Legion.

Geography
The entirety of Morgan County is located in the Upper Oconee River sub-basin of the Altamaha River basin.

Major highways

  Interstate 20
  U.S. Route 129
  U.S. Route 129 Bypass
  U.S. Route 278
  U.S. Route 278 Truck
  U.S. Route 441
  U.S. Route 441 Bypass
  State Route 12
  State Route 12 Truck
  State Route 24
  State Route 24 Bypass
  State Route 83
  State Route 186
  State Route 402 (unsigned designation for I-20)

Adjacent counties
 Oconee County (north)
 Greene County (east)
 Putnam County (southeast)
 Jasper County (southwest)
 Newton County (west)
 Walton County (northwest)

National protected area
 Oconee National Forest (part)

Demographics

2000 census
As of the census of 2000, there were 15,457 people, 5,558 households, and 4,301 families living in the county.  The population density was 17/km2 (44/mi2).  There were 6,128 housing units at an average density of 7/km2 (18/mi2).  The racial makeup of the county was 69.69% White, 28.53% Black or African American, 0.14% Native American, 0.33% Asian, 0.01% Pacific Islander, 0.41% from other races, and 0.89% from two or more races.  1.60% of the population were Hispanic or Latino of any race.

There were 5,558 households, out of which 34.80% had children under the age of 18 living with them, 58.90% were married couples living together, 14.60% had a female householder with no husband present, and 22.60% were non-families. 19.40% of all households were made up of individuals, and 7.80% had someone living alone who was 65 years of age or older.  The average household size was 2.75 and the average family size was 3.15.

In the county, the population was spread out, with 26.60% under the age of 18, 7.80% from 18 to 24, 28.70% from 25 to 44, 24.50% from 45 to 64, and 12.50% who were 65 years of age or older.  The median age was 37 years. For every 100 females there were 93.90 males.  For every 100 females age 18 and over, there were 89.90 males.

The median income for a household in the county was $40,249, and the median income for a family was $46,146. Males had a median income of $34,634 versus $22,206 for females. The per capita income for the county was $18,823.  About 8.90% of families and 10.90% of the population were below the poverty line, including 14.10% of those under age 18 and 9.60% of those age 65 or over.

2010 census
As of the 2010 United States Census, there were 17,868 people, 6,660 households, and 5,073 families living in the county. The racial makeup of the county was 72.7% white, 23.6% black or African American, 0.6% Asian, 0.3% American Indian, 1.6% from other races, and 1.3% from two or more races. Those of Hispanic or Latino origin made up 2.8% of the population. In terms of ancestry, 16.8% were American, 12.5% were English, 11.4% were Irish, and 9.0% were German.

Of the 6,660 households, 35.4% had children under the age of 18 living with them, 56.7% were married couples living together, 14.7% had a female householder with no husband present, 23.8% were non-families, and 20.7% of all households were made up of individuals. The average household size was 2.66 and the average family size was 3.06. The median age was 41.3 years.

The median income for a household in the county was $45,817 and the median income for a family was $57,724. Males had a median income of $44,101 versus $30,133 for females. The per capita income for the county was $27,732. About 13.5% of families and 15.4% of the population were below the poverty line, including 17.9% of those under age 18 and 14.1% of those age 65 or over.

2020 census

As of the 2020 United States Census, there were 20,097 people, 6,942 households, and 5,250 families residing in the county.

Communities

Cities
 Bostwick
 Buckhead
 Madison (county seat)
 Rutledge

Unincorporated communities
 Apalachee
 Godfrey (ghost town)
 Pennington

Politics

See also

 National Register of Historic Places listings in Morgan County, Georgia
List of counties in Georgia

References

 
Georgia (U.S. state) counties
1807 establishments in Georgia (U.S. state)
Populated places established in 1807